Stylobasium spathulatum ("pebble bush") is a species of xerophytic shrub in the family Surianaceae. It was first described in 1819 by René Louiche Desfontaines and is endemic to the Northern Territory, Queensland, and Western Australia.

The specific epithet, spathulatum, is a Latin adjective (spathulatus,-a,-um) meaning "spoon-shaped" and refers to the shape of the leaves.

The Walmajarri people call this bush Kuparta.

Gallery

References

External links
Stylobasium apathulatum occurrence data from Australasian Virtual Herbarium

Flora of Australia
Surianaceae
Flora of the Northern Territory
Flora of Queensland
Flora of Western Australia
Plants described in 1819
Taxa named by René Louiche Desfontaines